The following companies and organisations currently manufacture tractors.

A

 Ace  (India)
 AGCO Corporation (United States) 
 AGCO (US) 
 AGCO Allis (Argentina, formerly (US)) 
 Challenger (US) 
 Fendt (Germany) 
 Massey Ferguson (US) 
 Valtra (Finland) 
 Agrale (Brazil)
 Agrinar (Argentina) 
 Al-Ghazi Tractors (Pakistan)(licensed/Fiat) 
 Fiat Trattori
Arbos (Italy)
 ARGO SpA (Italy)
 Landini 
 McCormick Tractors
 Valpadana

B

 Basak Traktor (Turkey)
 Bombardier (Canada)

C

 Carraro Agritalia (Italy)
 Case (US)
 Case IH (US)(part of CNH Global)
 Caterpillar Inc. (CAT) (USA)
 Challenger (USA)
 Chelyabinsk Tractor Plant (Russia) 
 ChTZ
 Claas (Germany)
 CNH Industrial  (Italy/(US))
 Case IH  (US)
 New Holland  (US)
 Steyr  (Austria) 
 Cockshutt Plow Company (Canada)
 Cub Cadet

D

 Daedong  (South Korea)
 Deere & Company (US)
 John Deere
 Deutz-Allis (UK)
 Deutz-Fahr (Germany)

E

 Eastman Industries
   Ingersoll Power Equipment
 Escorts  (India)
 ETRAG  (Algeria)

F

 Fendt (Germany)
 Force Motors  (formerly Bajaj Tempo Ltd) (India)
 Ford-New Holland (US)
 Fordson (US)
 Fiatagri (Italy)

G

Ganja Auto Plant (Azerbaijan) 
Goldoni (Italy)
 Gravely Tractor

H

 Harbin (China) 
  Harbin SongJiang
 Husqvarna
Hitachi

I

 International Harvester(US)
 Sonalika Tractors
 Iseki  (Japan)

J

 JCB (England)
 John Deere  (US)

K

 KhTZ (Kharkiv Tractor Plant) (Ukraine)
 Komatsu (Japan)
 Kubota (Japan)

L

 Lamborghini (Italy) (part of SDF concern)
 Landini (Italy) (part of ARGO SpA concern)
 Lindner (Austria)
 LS Mtron (South Korea)

M

 Mahindra Tractors (India)
 Erkunt (Turkey)(part of Mahindra)
   ArmaTrac
 Mahindra
 Mitsubishi Agricultural Machinery (Japan)(own 33.3%)
  Trakstar (formerly Mahindra Gujarat and Shaktimaan brands)
 Massey Ferguson (US)(see AGCO)
 Millat (Pakistan) 
 Mitsubishi Agricultural Machinery (Japan) 
 MoAZ (Belarus)
 MTD  (US)
 MTZ  (Belarus)
 Belarus

N

 New Holland  (United States) (part of ARGO SpA concern)

P

 Pol-Mot  (Poland)
 Ursus (Poland) 
 Pronar  (Poland)

S

 SAME Deutz-Fahr (SDF)  (Italy)
 Deutz-Fahr (Germany)
 Steiger (USA)
 Steyr (Austria) (part of CNH Global)

T

 Tractors And Farm Equipment  (India) 
 IMT  (Serbia) (purchased by TAFE in 2018 and restarted)
 TAFE
 TYM (South Korea)
 Toro
 Wheel Horse (defunct as of 2007)

U

 URSUS (Poland)(purchased by Pol-Mot)
 Ursus (Brazil) (URSUS MÁQUINAS AGRÍCOLAS LTDA)(mfg licensed Mahindra)

V

 Valpadana  (Italy) (part of ARGO SpA concern)
 Valtra  (Finland) (part of AGCO concern)
 Versatile (Canada) (owned by RostSelMash)
 Volvo (Sweden)

W

 Wisconsin Engineering  (Czech)

Y

 Yagmur  (Turkey)
 Valpadana (licensed)
 Yanmar (Japan)
 YTO (China)
 YuMZ  (Ukraine)

Z

 Zetor  (Czech)
 Zoomlion (China)

See also
 Tractors in India - details of Indian tractor building history and brands

References

External links
 List of tractor models by manufacturer (tractordata.com)